The Aircraft Classification Number (ACN) – Pavement Classification Number (PCN) method is a standardized international airport pavement rating system promulgated by the ICAO in 1981. The method has been the official ICAO pavement rating system for pavements intended for aircraft of apron (ramp) mass greater than 5700 kg from 1981 to 2020.

For the safe and efficient use of pavements, the method has been designed to:

 enable aircraft operators to determine the permissible operating weights for their aircraft;
 assist aircraft manufacturers to ensure compatibility between airfield pavements and the aircraft under development;
 permit airport authorities to report on the aircraft they can accept and allow them to use any evaluation procedure of their choice to ascertain the loading the pavements can accept.

The method relies on the plain comparison of two numbers:

 The ACN, a number that expresses the relative effect on an airplane of a given weight on a pavement structure for a specified standard subgrade strength;
 The PCN, a number (and series of letters) representing the pavement bearing strength (on the same scale than ACN) of a given pavement section (runway, taxiway, apron) for unrestricted operations.

Aircraft Classification Number (ACN)
The ACN calculation process is fully described in ICAO Doc 9157 Aerodrome Design Manual – Part 3 "Pavements". 

The procedure to calculate the ACN is as such:

 Design a theoretical pavement according to a defined criterion:
 For flexible pavements, design the pavement for 10,000 load applications of the aircraft according to the CBR design procedure combined with Boussinesq's solution for deflection in the elastic half-space
 For rigid pavements, design the pavement to reach a standard flexural stress of 2.75 MPa at the bottom of the cement concrete layer according to Westergaard theory
 Calculate the single wheel load, inflated at 1.25 MPa, that would require the same pavement – this is the Derived Single Wheel Load (DSWL)
 The ACN is defined as twice the DSWL, expressed in thousands of kilograms

The ACN are calculated for four standard subgrade strengths, for flexible and rigid pavements, thus leading to 8 different values. 

ACNs depend on the landing gear geometry (number of wheels and wheel spacing), the landing gear load (that is dependent upon the aircraft weight and center of gravity) and the tire pressure.

Normally, the aftmost center of gravity for the Maximum Ramp Weight (MRW) lead to the critical ACN. 

Aircraft manufacturers publish the ACNs of their aircraft in their respective Aircraft Characteristics manuals.

The ICAO Aerodrome Design Manual contains the source code of computer programs for the calculation of ACNs. The FAA also developed COMFAA, a software enabling the calculation of ACNs for different aircraft depending on the input parameters.

Pavement Classification Number (PCN) 

Contrary to the ACN, the ICAO does not prescribe a standardized calculation procedure for the PCN. Different PCN calculation procedures may therefore be found around the world.

However, the ICAO defines a standardized reporting format for the PCN that comprises the PCN numerical value and a series of 4 letters.

PCN may also be known as Load Classification Number or LCN.

PCNs depend on both the pavement structure and the aircraft traffic operated on the pavement.  

The PCN are determined by airports for their runways, taxiways and aprons and published in the Aeronautical Information Publication (AIP).

Application by aerodrome authorities and aircraft operators 
An aircraft having an ACN (at a given weight) equal to or less than the PCN can operate without restriction on the pavement, provided that its tire pressure does not exceed the PCN limitation.

If the ACN exceeds the PCN, some restrictions (for example on weight of frequency of operation) may apply depending on the national or local regulations for overload operations. 

With the exception of massive overloading, pavements in their structural behaviour are not subject to particular limiting load above which they suddenly or catastrophically fail. 

As a result, minor or medium overload operations may be allowed by the airport authority depending on the corresponding loss in pavement life expectancy.

Evolutions and limitations

The ACN-PCN method underwent 2 major changes since its introduction in 1981:

 In 2007, the ICAO adopted a new set of alpha-factors for the calculation of ACNs on flexible pavements based on findings from full-scale pavement tests. This led to a reduction of the flexible ACNs for all landing gears with four wheels or more.
 In 2013, the ICAO adopted new limits for the tire pressure categories, again based on findings from full-scale pavement tests.

Despite these changes, the ACN-PCN method gradually became inconsistent with recent pavement design methods, mostly based on Linear Elastic Analysis (LEA) or Finite Element Method (FEM). The method is also failing to consider accurately the effect of modern landing gear configurations (with multi-wheels arrangements) and the improved characteristics of new-generation pavement materials.

As a result, the ICAO triggered the development of a new pavement rating method aimed at overcoming these deficiencies. This new system, the ACR-PCR method, became effective in July 2020.

Aircraft ACN list

References

Airport infrastructure
Pavement engineering
